Pedicularis verticillata, the whorled lousewort, is a species of flowering plant in the family Orobanchaceae which can be found in Alaska, North-Western Canada, and everywhere in China at the elevation of . Its native habitats include moist meadows and lakeshores.

Description
The stems are erect at the center and have hairs which come in four lines. Raceme is inflorescent and dense, with white coloured flowers.

See also
Pedicularis lanata
Pedicularis sudetica

References

External links
Description of how plant blooms and photos of it every day life on Alaska Wildflowers

verticillata
Flora of Alaska
Flora of Canada
Flora of China
Plants described in 1753
Taxa named by Carl Linnaeus
Flora without expected TNC conservation status
Flora of the Carpathians